The St. Petersburg Lawn Bowling Club is a historic site in St. Petersburg, Florida. It is located at 536 4th Avenue, North. On July 9, 1980, it was added to the U.S. National Register of Historic Places. It is the oldest formally organized lawn bowling club in Florida and tenth in the nation. It includes members from USA, Canada, Ireland, England, Scotland, Australia, German heritage.

Club season runs November to April.  Free lessons Monday, Wednesday, Friday at 9 am followed by a game until 12:00.

Open houses on the first Saturday of the months December, January, February, March

References

External links
 Pinellas County listings at National Register of Historic Places
 Florida's Office of Cultural and Historical Programs
 Pinellas County listings
 St. Petersburg Lawn Bowling Club

National Register of Historic Places in Pinellas County, Florida
Buildings and structures in St. Petersburg, Florida
Bowls clubs
1916 establishments in Florida